is a city located in Akita Prefecture, Japan. , the city had an estimated population of 32,858 in 13,897  households, and a population density of 330 persons per km².

Geography
Katagami is located in the coastal plains of northwestern Akita Prefecture, with the Sea of Japan on the southwest and the remnant of Lake Hachirōgata to the northwest. It has the smallest area of any city in Akita Prefecture.

Neighboring municipalities
Akita Prefecture
Akita
Oga
Ikawa
Gojōme
Ōgata

Demographics
Per Japanese census data, the population of Katakami has been relatively steady over the past 70 years.

Climate
Katagami has a Humid continental climate (Köppen climate classification Cfa) with large seasonal temperature differences, with warm to hot (and often humid) summers and cold (sometimes severely cold) winters. Precipitation is significant throughout the year, but is heaviest from August to October. The average annual temperature in Katagami is 11.2 °C. The average annual rainfall is 1631 mm with September as the wettest month. The temperatures are highest on average in August, at around 24.9 °C, and lowest in January, at around -0.8 °C.

History
The area of present-day Katagami was part of ancient Dewa Province. During the Edo period, the area came under the control of the Satake clan, who ruled the northern third of the province from Kubota Domain. After the start of the Meiji period, the area became part of Minamiakita District, Akita Prefecture in 1878 with the establishment of the modern municipalities system.

The city of Katagami was established on March 22, 2005, from the merger of the three towns of Iitagawa, Shōwa and Tennō (all from Minamiakita District).

Government
Katagami has a mayor-council form of government with a directly elected mayor and a unicameral city legislature of 18 members. The city contributes one member to the Akita Prefectural Assembly.  In terms of national politics, the city is part of Akita District 2 of the lower house of the Diet of Japan.

Economy
The economy of Katagami is based on agriculture and commercial fishing.

Education
Katagami has six public elementary schools and three public middle schools operated by the city government and one public high school operated by the Akita Prefectural Board of Education. The prefecture also operates one special education school for the handicapped.

Transportation

Railway
 East Japan Railway Company - Ōu Main Line
  - 
 East Japan Railway Company - Oga Line
  -  -  -

Highways
  Akita Expressway

Noted people from Katagami 
Koji Futada, politician
Koya Handa, professional soccer player
Kenichi Kaga, professional soccer player
Yuki Kikuchi, basketball player
Ikuo Nakamura, photographer
Kazushi Sakuraba, mixed martial artist
Kenichi Takahashi (basketball), basketball player
Kōsei Yoshida, professional baseball player

References

External links

Official Website 

 
Cities in Akita Prefecture
Populated coastal places in Japan